Martovsky is a rural locality (a passing loop) in "Posyolok Verkhny Baskunchak" of Akhtubinsky District, Astrakhan Oblast, Russia. The population was 12 as of 2010.

Geography 
Martovsky is located 60 km southeast of Akhtubinsk (the district's administrative centre) by road. Verkhny Baskunchak is the nearest rural locality.

References 

Rural localities in Akhtubinsky District